TMK 101 is a type of two-axle tramcar which was used in Zagreb (Croatia) from 1951 until December 2008, when the last vehicle of this type was withdrawn from regular service. They were single-ended (controls at one end only) and had all 3 doors on the right-hand side only, in conformity with standard Zagreb (ZET) operating practices. Maximum passenger capacity (crush load) was 95, and they were fitted with two electric motors rated with a total continuous power output of 120 kW which gave a maximum speed of 55 km/h. The TMK 101 was the first modern type of tram produced in Croatia, featuring automatic door openers, driver's and conductor's seats, electrical, air-operated, and mechanical brakes, and a protective windshield at the front. Couplings were provided for trailer operation.

Engineer Mandl and his team of constructors in ZET's workshops finished constructing the first prototype, No. 101, on 4 April 1951. Three prototypes were made by ZET in their own workshops; Đuro Đaković's factory in Slavonski Brod was contracted to build the remaining 68 vehicles to ZET’s specifications, together with 110 matching trailers (which were numbered 591 to 700). Series production began in 1957, and continued until 1965. Another 32 trailers built from 1973 to 1974 (for the TMK 201 trams) could also be used by TMK 101 cars.

After withdrawal, a number of these trams were converted to service (non-passenger) vehicles. One car (prototype No. 101, together with matching trailer No. 592) has been retained by ZET as part of their historical fleet, and has been repainted in the current all-over blue livery.

A book written about this tram was called Tram 101: 1951-2008. (authors Dražen Bijelić and Željko Halambek).

Trams of this design have also been used in Osijek (from 1963 to 1981) and in Belgrade (from 1964 to 1980).

Liveries 

These trams have carried three different Yugoslav tramcar colour schemes, one for each of the different operators: in Zagreb they were cream-and-blue, in Osijek cream-and-red, and in Belgrade cream-and-green.

References

TMK Trams
Tram vehicles of Croatia
Tram vehicles of Serbia
Đuro Đaković (company)